Enrico Colombari (31 January 1905 – 8 March 1983) was an Italian professional football player and coach who played as a midfielder.

Club career
Colombari won the Italian championship with A.C. Torino in 1927–28.

He played for 8 seasons (242 games, 10 goals) in the Serie A for Torino and S.S.C. Napoli.

International career
Colombari made his debut for the Italy national football team on 14 October 1928 in a game against Switzerland.
He made 2 starts in the gold winning 1927-30 Central European International Cup campaign & 1 in the silver winning 1931-32 Central European International Cup campaign.

International 
Italy
 Central European International Cup: 1927-30
 Central European International Cup: Runner-up: 1931-32

External links

References

1905 births
1983 deaths
Italian footballers
Italy international footballers
Serie A players
Serie B players
Pisa S.C. players
Torino F.C. players
S.S.C. Napoli players
A.C. Savoia 1908 players
Italian football managers
Empoli F.C. managers
Ternana Calcio managers
Treviso F.B.C. 1993 managers
Association football midfielders